Territorial Assembly elections were held in Mauritania on 30 March 1952. The result was a victory for the Mauritanian Progressive Union, which won 22 of the 24 seats.

Electoral system
The Territorial Assembly was elected by two colleges; the first college elected 8 members and the second 16.

Results

References

Elections in Mauritania
Mauritania
1952 in Mauritania
Election and referendum articles with incomplete results
March 1952 events in Africa